The 624th Operations Center (624 OC) is an inactive unit of the United States Air Force. It was inactivated on 16 March 2020 and last located at Joint Base San Antonio, Texas, with its responsibilities transferred to the newly activated 616th Operations Center.  Prior to its inactivation, it served as the Sixteenth Air Force's operational arm to provide a robust full-spectrum and integrated cyberspace operations capability. The 624 OC interfaced with theater and functional Air Operations Centers to establish, plan, direct, coordinate, assess, and command & control cyber operations in support of AF and Joint war fighting requirements.

Components 

 Intelligence, Surveillance and Reconnaissance Division  (ISRD)
 Strategy Division (SRD)
 Combat Plans Division (CPD)
 Combat Operations Division (COD) 
 Cyber Coordination Cell (CRC)
 Air Communications Division (ACOMD)

History 

On 20 August 2009, the Secretary of the Air Force issued a letter announcing the re-alignment of Air Force Cyberspace activities.  The letter announced the inactivation of the 608th Air Force Network Operations Center, and activation the 624th Operations Center.  In addition, the new 624th Operations Center would report to Twenty-Fourth Air Force, Air Force Space Command (a change of reporting from Eighth Air Force, Air Combat Command).

A new emblem for the unit was posted to the website of The Institute of Heraldry on 23 April 2012.

The 624th Operations Center was inactivated on 16 March 2020 alongside the 625th Operations Center in a ceremony at Joint Base San Antonio that also activated the newly formed 616th Operations Center, tasked to take over the responsibilities of the two inactivated units.

Lineage 

 Designated as 145th Airways and Air Communications Service Squadron on 14 May 1948
 Organized on 1 June 1948
 Redesignated as 1957th Airways and Air Communications Service Squadron on 1 October 1948
 Redesignated as 1957th Airways and Air Communications Service Group on 18 September 1959
 Redesignated as Headquarters, 1957th Airways and Air Communications Service Group on 8 October 1959
 Redesignated as Headquarters, 1957th Communications Group on 1 July 1961
 Redesignated as 1957th Information Systems Group on 1 August 1984
 Redesignated as 1957th Communications Group on 1 November 1986
 Inactivated on 13 April 1992
 Redesignated as 624th Operations Center on 11 August 2009
 Activated on 18 August 2009
 Inactivated on 16 March 2020

Assignments 

 71st Airways and Air Communications Service Group, 1 June 1948
 1810th Airways and Air Communications Service Group, 1 October 1948
 Pacific Communications Area, 1 November 1957
 1957th Airways and Air Communications (later, 1957th Communications) Group, 8 October 1959
 Pacific Communications Area (later, Pacific Communications Division; Pacific Information Systems Division; Pacific Communications Division), 8 November 1959
 15th Air Base Wing, 1 October 1990 – 13 April 1992
 Twenty-Fourth Air Force, 18 August 2009 – 11 October 2019
 Sixteenth Air Force, 11 October 2019 – 16 March 2020

Stations 

 Hickam Air Force Base, Hawaii, 1 June 1948 – 13 April 1992
 Lackland Air Force Base (later, Joint Base San Antonio), Texas, 18 August 2009 – 16 March 2020

Decorations 

 Navy Meritorious Unit Commendation: 1 January 1968 – 26 July 1969
 Air Force Outstanding Unit Awards: 1 February – 30 November 1962; 1 January 1966 – 31 December 1967; 1 July 1989 – 30 June 1991; 1 November 2012 – 31 October 2014

See also 
 Air Operations Center

References 

Centers of the United States Air Force
Military units and formations established in 1948
1948 establishments in Hawaii